An Se-bok (born 29 October 1946) is a North Korean football midfielder who played for North Korea in the 1966 FIFA World Cup. He also played for Amrokgang Sports Team.

References

1946 births
North Korean footballers
North Korea international footballers
Association football midfielders
Amnokgang Sports Club players
1966 FIFA World Cup players
Living people